Johnny Dunne (1 December 1903 – 7 September 1954) was an Irish hurler who played as a full-forward for the Kilkenny senior team.

Born in Bennettsbridge, County Kilkenny, Dunne first arrived on the inter-county scene at the age of twenty-three when he first linked up with the Kilkenny senior team. Dunne went on to play a key part for Kilkenny during a successful era for the team, and won two All-Ireland medals, three Leinster medals and one National Hurling League medal. He was an All-Ireland runner-up on one occasion.

As a member of the Leinster inter-provincial team, Dunne won two Railway Cup medals. At club level he won one championship medal with Mooncoin.

Dunne's retirement came following the conclusion of the 1938 championship.

References

1903 births
1954 deaths
All-Ireland Senior Hurling Championship winners
Dicksboro hurlers
Irish postmen
Kilkenny inter-county hurlers
Leinster inter-provincial hurlers
Mooncoin hurlers